Korani Rural District is a rural district (dehestan) in Korani District, Bijar County, Kurdistan Province, Iran. At the 2006 census, its population was 4,775, in 1,078 families. The rural district has 24 villages.

References 

Rural Districts of Kurdistan Province
Bijar County